The Women's International Match Racing Series is an annual match racing series for women.

Winners

See also
World Match Racing Tour
match racing
World Sailing Women's Match Racing Ranking

References

 
Sailing series
Women's sailing competitions
Match racing competitions